"Red Hot" is a song written and recorded by Billy "The Kid" Emerson and released on Sun Records in 1955. It has been covered many times.

Emerson's version
Emerson recorded the song at the Sun Recording Studio in Memphis, Tennessee on May 31, 1955.  Besides Emerson as vocalist, the Sam Phillips produced session included Calvin Newborn, guitar; Kenneth Banks, bass; Phineas Newborn, Sr., drums; Billy 'Red' Love, piano; Jewell Briscoe, tenor sax; and Moses Reed, tenor sax.  The b-side for the release was another Emerson song, "No Greater Love".

Covers
The best known cover of "Red Hot," also recorded at Sun Studio, produced by Sam Phillips, and released on Sun Records was by Billy Lee Riley & The Little Green Men, in January 1957 and issued as # 277.  Along with Riley on vocals and guitar were guitarist Roland Janes, drummer J. M. Van Eaton, bassist Marvin Pepper, and Jimmy Wilson on piano. The record did not chart. 
 Another fine version recorded in early 1957, this time at Mira Smith's Ram Studios, Shreveport, Louisiana is by Bob Luman (Imperial XB8313, 1957) featuring James Burton on guitar - arguably the best version.
Ronnie Hawkins released a version of the song on his first album, Ronnie Hawkins, on Roulette Records, # SR-25078 in 1959.  The drummer on the session was future member of The Band, Levon Helm, then a member of Hawkins' backing band, The Hawks.
The Beatles performed "Red Hot" in December 1962, live at the Star-Club in Hamburg, but the recording has never been officially released.
Robert Gordon with Link Wray on guitar, released a version on his debut album for Private Stock Records, # PS-2030 in 1977.
The song is performed by Joss Ackland (as Evil Edmunds and The BeeLzeeBOPS) in the 2003 movie, I'll Be There.
 Brian Setzer released a version of the song on his 2005 album Rockabilly Riot, Vol. 1 - A Tribute to Sun Records.

References

1955 songs
1955 singles
1957 singles
1959 singles
Songs written by Billy "The Kid" Emerson